Kalijärv is a lake of Estonia located in the Tapa Parish.

See also
List of lakes of Estonia

Lakes of Estonia